The 45th International Film Festival of India was held on 20 to 30 November 2014 in Goa. China is the focus country for the festival.

Winners
Golden Peacock (Best Film): "Leviathan" by "Andrey Zvyagintsev"
Silver Peacock (Best Film): "Ek Hazarachi Note" by Shrihari Sathe
IFFI Best Director Award: Nadav Lapid for "The Kindergarten Teacher"
IFFI Best Actor Award (Male): Silver Peacock Award: Aleksei Serebryakov for "Leviathan" and Dulal Sarkar for "Chotoder Chobi".
IFFI Best Actor Award (Female): Silver Peacock Award:  Alina Rodriguez for  "Behavior" and Sarit Larry for "The Kindergarten Teacher"

Special Awards
Centenary Award for "Ek Hazarachi Note" by Shrihari Sathe
Life Time Achievement Award - Wong Kar-wai
IFFI Indian Film Personality of the Year Award: Rajinikanth

Official selections

Special screenings

Opening film
The President, directed by Mohsen Makhmalbaf (Iran)

Closing film
The Grandmaster, by Wong Kar-wai (China)

References

External links
 

2014 film festivals
2014 festivals in Asia
International Film Festival of India
2014 in Indian cinema